Akim Zedadka (born 30 May 1995) is a professional footballer who plays as a right-back for  club Auxerre, on loan from Lille. Born in France, he plays for the Algeria national team.

Club career
In 2017, Akim Zedadka joined French lower league side AS Saint Rémoise. He then joined Clermont in 2019, playing almost 100 games with the Auvergne team. 

On 30 June 2022, he signed for Ligue 1 side Lille on a three-year contract. On 9 December 2022, he signed for AJ Auxerre on loan until the end of the 2022–23 season.

International career
Born in France, Zedadka is of Algerian descent. He was called up to the Algeria national team in May 2022. Zedadka made his debut with Algeria in a 2–1 friendly win over Iran on 12 June 2022.

References

1995 births
Living people
Sportspeople from Vaucluse
French sportspeople of Algerian descent
French footballers
Footballers from Provence-Alpes-Côte d'Azur
Association football fullbacks
Ligue 1 players
Ligue 2 players
Championnat National players
Championnat National 2 players
Championnat National 3 players
FC Istres players
RC Lens players
Marignane Gignac Côte Bleue FC players
Clermont Foot players
Lille OSC players
AJ Auxerre players